Garhwa District is one of the twenty-four districts in the Indian state of Jharkhand. The Garhwa District is part of the Palamu division and has its administrative headquarters in Garhwa City.

History
The Garhwa District was established on April 1, 1991, from the former Palamu district, by separating its former Garhwa sub-division. It has been a part of the Red Corridor since 2011.

Administration 
The Garhwa district includes three subdivisions: Garhwa, Nagar Untari and Ranka, which are further divided into 20 blocks.

This district comprises a 156-gram panchayat and 916 villages.

It has three police sub-divisions: Garhwa, Shree Banshidhar Nagar and Ranka, with 18 police stations in Bhandaria, Ramkanda, Chinia, Dandai, Danda, Kandi, Bardiha, Ketar, Kharaundhi, Bhawnathpur, Dhurki, Ramna, Bishunpura, Garhwa, Manjhiaon Garhwa, Meral, Shree Banshidhar Nagar and Ranka.

Below is the list of blocks in Garhwa district:

Bhandaria
Danda
Garhwa
Manjhiaon
Ramkanda
Bishunpura
Bhawnathpur
Dandai
Kandi
Meral
Ramna
Ketar
Sagma
Chinia
Dhurki
Kharaundhi
Shree Banshidhar Nagar
Ranka
Bardiha
Bargarh

Geography
The Garhwa district lies between 23° 60’ and 24° 39’ north latitude and 83° 22’ and 84° 00’ east longitude. It is bordered by the Son River to the north, the Palamau district of Jharkhand state to the east, the Balrampur district of Chhattisgarh state to the south, and the Sonbhadra district of Uttar Pradesh to the west.

Economy
In 2006, the Indian government named Garhwa District one of the 250 most backward districts in the country, out of a total of 640. It is one of the 21 districts in Jharkhand state currently receiving funds from the Backward Regions Grant Fund Programme (BRGF).

Transport
Garhwa is well-connected to roads and railways. Daily bus services are available from Ranchi and the much bigger districts of Jharkhand, Chhattisgarh and Bihar, but road connections in this district are not as high quality as others in the state. The district is connected to Rewa in Madhya Pradesh and Ranchi in Jharkhand by National Highway No. 39. There are 210 km of state highway, 55 km of national highway (NH-39) and 96.95 km of district roads. There is a total of 190 km link roads and corridors.

The nearest airport is located at Varanasi (140 km). Garhwa Railway Station is a major railhead of the Eastern Railway zone. National Highway 39 passes through Garhwa.

Demographics

According to the 2011 census, Garhwa district has a population of 1,322,784, roughly equal to the nation of Mauritius or the US state of New Hampshire. This number gives it a ranking of 368th in India, out of a total of 640. Its population growth rate over the decade 2001-2011 was 27.71%. Garhwa has a sex ratio of 933 females for every 1,000 males, and a literacy rate of 62.18%. Scheduled Castes and Scheduled Tribes make up 24.19% and 15.56% of the population respectively.

At the time of the 2011 Census of India, 54.52% of the population in the district spoke Hindi, 26.24% Magahi, 7.29% Bhojpuri, 5.39% Sadri and 5.29% Urdu as their first language. Another 11,000 speak Kurukh.

Politics 
Garhwa has two assembly constituencies, Garhwa and Bhawanthpur. Both are part of Palamu Lok Sabha constituency, whose MP is Vishnu Dayal Ram from the BJP. 
 

 |}

Towns and villages
 

Garhwa
Hoor
Sirhe

See also
Palamu district
Jharkhand
 Nagar Untari
Giridih

References

External links
 Official district government website

 
Districts of Jharkhand
1991 establishments in Bihar